Marcelo Miranda can refer to:

 Marcelo Miranda (footballer)
 Marcelo Miranda (politician)